Alberto Rendo (born 3 January 1940) is an Argentine former footballer who competed in the 1960 Summer Olympics.

Career
Born in Parque Patricios, Buenos Aires, Rendo played club football in the Argentine Primera División with Huracán and San Lorenzo. He finished his career in the Mexican Primera División with Laguna.

References

1940 births
Living people
Association football forwards
Argentine footballers
Argentina international footballers
Olympic footballers of Argentina
Footballers at the 1960 Summer Olympics
Club Atlético Huracán footballers
San Lorenzo de Almagro footballers
Argentine Primera División players
Liga MX players
Argentine expatriate footballers
Expatriate footballers in Mexico
Club Atlético Huracán managers
Argentine football managers
Footballers from Buenos Aires